Dan Harris (born August 29, 1979) is an American screenwriter and director best known for working with Michael Dougherty and Bryan Singer, and whose writing credits include Superman Returns, X2 and X-Men: Apocalypse.

Early life
Harris was raised in Kingston, Pennsylvania. He went to Wyoming Valley West Middle and High schools,  and graduated from Wyoming Seminary.  Before he received his bachelor's degree from Columbia University, Harris's short film Urban Chaos Theory won the Grand Jury Prize for Best Short Film at the NoDance Film Festival, and the following winter, his short film, "The Killing of Candice Klein", played at the 2002 Sundance Film Festival.

Career
Harris made his feature film directing debut with Imaginary Heroes, starring Sigourney Weaver, Jeff Daniels, Emile Hirsch and Michelle Williams. The film had its world premiere at the 29th Toronto International Film Festival and opened Winter 2005 after being given special recognition for excellence in filmmaking from the National Board of Review.

In addition to Superman Returns, Harris and his writing partner Michael Dougherty have co-written many films, including Urban Legends: Bloody Mary and X2, which he wrote at the age of 22 for director Bryan Singer, an assignment offered to him after the director read the screenplay for Imaginary Heroes. In the same year, he was honored as one of Variety’s top 10 screenwriters to watch.

Harris directed I, Lucifer, a film based on the novel which he adapted with Michael Dougherty. Harris and Dougherty opted out of writing the upcoming Superman sequel.

Harris co-wrote X-Men: Apocalypse with Singer, Dougherty and Simon Kinberg.

Also with Dougherty and Singer, Harris wrote the Superman Returns prequel comic books for DC Comics.

Harris' photography has twice been published by New York fashion and arts landmark Visionaire and he was part of Vanity Fair's "Hollywood Portfolio" in 2005.

Filmography

References

External links

1979 births
American male screenwriters
Living people
People from Kingston, Pennsylvania
Screenwriters from Pennsylvania
Film directors from Pennsylvania
Wyoming Seminary alumni
Columbia College (New York) alumni